Mickey's Adventures in Numberland (referred as Mickey's Adventure in Numberland on its cover) is an educational Nintendo Entertainment System game starring the cartoon character Mickey Mouse.

Gameplay
Mickey must collect all of the numbers from one to ten in order to prevent the evil Pete from completely robbing Numberland. The five levels are: Number City, Number Factory, Space Center, Number Museum, and Pete's Hideout. Basic math questions must be answered in order to progress to the next level. There are three difficulty levels; players can only "die" on the hardest difficulty level. The player is given balls of bubblegum to be used against enemies as a weapon.

The hardest mode of the video game has a secondary function: to teach children about the basics of playing side-scrolling platform video games.

See also
 List of Disney video games

References

External links
 

1994 video games
Children's educational video games
Hi Tech Expressions games
Mickey Mouse video games
Nintendo Entertainment System games
Nintendo Entertainment System-only games
North America-exclusive video games
Video games developed in Australia
Single-player video games